Thurlo E. "Mac" McCrady (July 31, 1907 – May 27, 1999) was an American football, basketball, and track coach, college athletics administrator, and professional sports executive. He served as the head football coach at Hastings College in Hastings, Nebraska from 1932 to 1940 and South Dakota State University in Brookings, South Dakota from 1941 to 1946. McCrady was also the athletic director at South Dakota State  fem 1941 to 1947 and Kansas State University from 1947 to 1951. He was the assistant commissioner of the American Football League (AFL) from 1959 to 1967 and executive director of the American Basketball Association (ABA) from 1967 to 1976.

McCrady graduated from Hasting in 1929 and earned a master's degree in physical education at the University of Southern California in 1940. He died on May 27, 1999, at his home in Lake San Marcos, California.

Head coaching record

Football

Notes

References

1907 births
1999 deaths
American Basketball Association executives
American Football League contributors
American men's basketball players
Basketball coaches from Nebraska
Basketball players from Nebraska
College track and field coaches in the United States
Hastings Broncos football coaches
Hastings Broncos football players
Hastings Broncos men's basketball players
Kansas State Wildcats athletic directors
People from Hastings, Nebraska
South Dakota State Jackrabbits athletic directors
South Dakota State Jackrabbits football coaches
South Dakota State Jackrabbits men's basketball coaches
University of Southern California alumni